Qamar-ud-din Khan Dughlat (Urdu; Persian;) was a Mongol ruler of Moghulistan between 1368 and 1392. He belonged to the Dughlat clan of Mongol warlords.

Under Tughlugh Timur, both Amirs Tuluk and Bulaji had held the office of ulus beg. After the death of Bulaji the office was given to his son Khudaidad. This was contested by Bulaji's brother, Qamar-ud-din, who desired to be ulus beg himself. His request for the office to be transferred to him was refused by Tughlugh Timur; consequently after the latter's death Qamar-ud-din revolted against Tughlugh Timur's son Ilyas Khoja Khan.

He was likely responsible for the death of Ilyas Khoja; most of the family members of Tughlugh Timur were also killed. Qamar-ud-din proclaimed himself khan, the only Dughlat ever to do so and although he did not gain the support of many of the amirs, managed to maintain his position in Moghulistan.

Qamar-ud-din's reign consisted of a series of wars with Amir Timur, the Amir of Timurid Empire of Central Asia. Qamar-ud-din's forces were unable to defeat the Great Timur Lane, but at the same time Timur could not decisively defeat Qamar-ud-din, whose men were able to retreat into the barren steppe country of Moghulistan. During a fresh invasion by Timur and his army in 1390, however, Qamar-ud-din disappeared. His disappearance enabled a Chagatayid, Khizr Khoja, to gain control of Moghulistan.

Qamar-ud-din's disappearance had left his nephew Khudaidad the senior member of the Dughlat family. Khudaidad had a very good knowledge about Genghis Khan's Yasa(law), which was an example of the Dughlats' continued respect for the Mongolian tradition. According to the Tarikh-i Rashidi, Khudaidad had been an early supporter of Khizr Khoja and had hid him from Qamar-ud-din during the latter's purge of members of the house of Chagatai. Khudaidad's power rapidly increased and he became a king-maker in the years after Khizr Khoja's death. He also divided Aksu, Khotan, and Kashgar and Yarkand amongst his family members; this division of territory lasted until the time of Mirza Abu Bakr Dughlat.

Notes

References
Barthold, W. "Dughlat." The Encyclopedia of Islam, Volume 2. New Ed. Leiden: E. J. Brill, 1965.
 Elias, N. Commentary. The Tarikh-i-Rashidi (A History of the Moghuls of Central Asia). By Mirza Muhammad Haidar. Translated by Edward Denison Ross, edited by N. Elias. London, 1895.
Grousset, René. The Empire of the Steppes: A History of Central Asia. Trans. Naomi Walford. New Jersey: Rutgers, 1970. 
Kim, Hodong. The Early History of the Moghul Nomads: The Legacy of the Chaghatai Khanate. The Mongol Empire and Its Legacy. Ed. Reuven Amitai-Preiss and David Morgan. Leiden: Brill, 1998. 
 Mirza Muhammad Haidar. The Tarikh-i-Rashidi (A History of the Moghuls of Central Asia). Translated by Edward Denison Ross, edited by N.Elias. London, 1895.

Mongol Empire Muslims
Dughlats
Chagatai khans

14th-century Mongol rulers

ca:Dughlat